Blueprint 76 was an American pop punk band started in 2002 by Royce Nunley after eight years in The Suicide Machines. The band's original lineup consisted of Nunley on lead vocals and bass, Steve Toth on guitar and Joe Reilly on drums. Joe Reilly "Joey Danger" a.k.a. "Joey B-Side" moved back to his hometown of Nashville to drum tech for The Pink Spiders who had just been signed to Geffen Records and was filled in by "Porno Bob" for the final tour and Warped Tour dates. Blueprint also lost member Steve Toth and added "Jon Berz" on guitar who also fronts "The Cast, The Camera" and is a multi-instrumentalist for Blasé Splee. Blueprint added Dan Powers as the new bassist and Royce finished out their last years as lead singer.

Discography 
 Into the Flames (2002)
 Better Late Than Never (2004)
 Later demo (2005)

External links 
Official website (archived)

Musical groups from Detroit
American pop punk groups
Musical groups established in 2002
Musical groups disestablished in 2005
2002 establishments in Michigan